Stefanos Sakellaridis (born 13 September 2004) is a Greek tennis player.

Sakellaridis has a career high ATP singles ranking of 647 achieved on 9 January 2023. He also has a career high ATP doubles ranking of 621 achieved on 10 October 2022.

Sakellaridis made his ATP main draw debut at the 2023 United Cup representing Greece, where he won his first ATP match ever against Belgian Zizou Bergs. As a result he moved 130 positions up into the top 700.

References

External links

2004 births
Living people
Greek male tennis players
Sportspeople from Athens